Victor Bourgeois (29 August 1897 – 24 July 1962) was a Belgian architect and urban planner, considered the greatest Belgian modernist architect.

Bourgeois was born in Charleroi and studied at the Royal Academy of Fine Arts in Brussels from 1914 through 1918, and was mentored by Henry van de Velde. Together with his brother Pierre Bourgeois, he founded several magazines, including 7 Arts (1922–1928).

In 1927 Bourgeois became the only Belgian invited to design a house for the Weissenhof Estate exhibition in Stuttgart, and the following year Bourgeois was a delegate to the first meeting of the Congrès international d'architecture moderne and a founding member of that organization.

He died on 24 July 1962 in Ixelles.

Cité Moderne 
Bourgeois's first important architectural work was a group of houses in the Rue du Cubisme in Koekelberg (Brussels Region), showing the direct influence of the Dutch modernists. His largest project was built between 1922 and 1925 in Sint-Agatha-Berchem (Brussels Region) for a cooperative for social housing, the Cité moderne included 275 units. Each of them are oriented towards the sun, with a private garden, and were designed for low-cost construction with the use of reinforced concrete, an experimental technique at the time.

The building style of the houses and small apartment houses was strictly unadorned, white with colored trim, with right angles and flat roofs, an early example of the modernist style. The entire district was planned by urban planner and landscape architect Louis Van der Swaelmen, intended to promote coexistence and solidarity between people, as well as provide for their safety. The names attributed to the streets and squares highlight these intentions: Foundation Street, Stewardship Street, Evolution Street, and Initiative Place.

The project earned Bourgeois the Grand Prize at the Exposition internationale des arts décoratifs et industriels modernes in 1925 and brought him international attention. Today it is said to be in poor condition and awaiting proper renovation.

Works 
 Apartment building, Rue du Cubisme, Koekelberg, 1922
 Cité Moderne, at Sint-Agatha-Berchem, 1922–1925
 Housing entry for the Weissenhof Estate, Stuttgart, 1927
 House and studio for the sculptor Oscar Jespers, Brussels, 1928
 Apartment buildings in Brussels, 1935
 Grand Palace, Leopold II Restaurant and Soprocol Pavilion, Brussels International Exposition, 1935
 Villa Le Jeannerie, Sint-Genesius-Rode, 1936
 House Eliat, Avenue de l'Uruguay 5, at Brussels, 1938
 Belgian Pavilion at the New York World's Fair, 1939, with Henry van de Velde and Léon Stynen
 Office des Comptes-Chèques Postaux, Brussels, 1937–1949
 Town Hall, Ostend, 1954-1960
 Town Hall, Nivelles, 1954
 Eternit Tower and Germinal Pavilion at the Expo 58, Brussels, 1958

1897 births
1962 deaths
People from Charleroi
20th-century Belgian architects
Modernist architects
International style architects
Burials at Ixelles Cemetery